Dancing with Maria is a 2014 Italian documentary film directed by Ivan Gergolet. It was presented at the International Critics' Week of 71st Venice International Film Festival.

The film is about María Fux, a 90 years old Argentinian dancer, choreographer, and dance therapist.
The film shows the activities carried out by Maria in the studio arranged in her home in Buenos Aires, with people with different extraction and disabilities.

It was in the nominations for the documentary category of 28th European Film Awards in 2015.

References

External links
 

2014 films
2014 documentary films
Italian documentary films
2010s Spanish-language films
Documentary films about dance
2010s Italian films